Plocoscelus podagricus is a species of fly in the family Micropezidae. It is found in Brazil and Peru.

References

External links 

 
 Plocoscelus podagricus at insectoid.info

Micropezidae
Insects described in 1848
Fauna of Brazil
Fauna of Peru